The Battle of Svindax was fought during the spring of 1022 between the Byzantine army of Emperor Basil II and the Georgian army of King George I.

History 
The battle was fought at Svindax (a medieval Georgian chronicler knew it as სვინდაქსი, Suindaksi) in the Phasiane province (Basiani, Basian, or Basean). Ultimately, the Byzantines won a decisive victory. In the aftermath of the conflict, George I of Georgia was forced to negotiate a peace treaty ending the Byzantine-Georgian wars over the succession of the domains of David III of Tao.

See also
Battle of Shirimni
Battle of Sasireti
Tao-Klarjeti

References 

 A Georgian chronicle Kartlis Cxovreba (Georgian)

Svindax
Svindax
1020s in the Byzantine Empire
Svindax
Svindax
Svindax
1022 in Asia
1022 in Europe
11th century in the Kingdom of Georgia